The Adventures of Bayou Billy is an action game released by Konami for the Nintendo Entertainment System in North America in 1989 and in the PAL region in 1991. It is a revised version of the 1988 Family Computer game , which has been modified with many graphical changes and an increase in the game's difficulty level. The game employs three play styles that were popular at the time: beat 'em up, light gun shooting and racing.

Plot
Billy West, otherwise known as Bayou Billy, is a Crocodile Dundee-like survivalist, vigilante, and former U.S. soldier from New Orleans, who has fought against a local crime boss, known as Godfather Gordon. In retaliation for interfering with his smuggling operations, Gordon kidnaps Billy's girlfriend Annabelle Lane in order to lure Billy into one final battle. Billy's quest to save Annabelle consists of nine stages that takes him from the swamplands to Bourbon Street, as he battles Gordon's henchmen and eventually arrives at Gordon's estate to come face-to-face with the big boss himself.

Gameplay

The majority of the game follows a side-scrolling beat-'em-up format in which the player character (Billy) must engage in hand-to-hand combat against every enemy he encounters in order to proceed from one area to the next until reaching the end of each stage before his health runs out. Billy's basic attacks consists of a punch, a kick and a jump kick performed by pressing the A and B buttons simultaneously. The player can also arm Billy with one of three melee weapons dropped by certain enemies: a throwing knife, a club and a whip. If the player picks up a new weapon while Billy is still in possession of a previous one, the new weapon will overwrite the previous one. Billy can also pick up guns, which the player can draw or withdraw at any time by pressing the Select button (when Billy is using a gun, the number next to the "bullet" indicator on the top portion of the screen will start flashing). Other power-ups in these stages include a chicken drumstick that refills Billy's health and a body armor that protects Billy from enemy bullets and reduces the damage he takes from other attacks. While the majority of the enemies in the beat-'em-up stages are human bad guys, the player will occasionally fight animals as well such as crocodiles, eagles and guard dogs.

In Stages 2 and 7, the game adopts a rail shooting format viewed from a first-person perspective, which can be played with a standard controller or with an NES Zapper, depending on the mode chosen by the player before the start of the game. In these stages, the player must shoot as many gunmen as possible and then destroy the boss at the end of the stage without running out of health or ammunition. Certain enemies will drop additional ammo and health kits, as well as other power-ups such as an hourglass that gives Billy unlimited ammo for a limited period, a bulletproof vest that leaves him invulnerable for a while as well, and a star that destroys all present enemies.

In Stages 4 and 5, the player must drive Billy's jeep through the freeway from the grasslands to the suburbs before time runs out. In these two stages, the player steers and accelerates the jeep with the d-pad, while the A and B buttons are used to launch grenades at airborne enemy vehicles and shoot at other cars in front of Billy's jeep. These are the only stages where the player does not have a health gauge and as a result, a single collision with an enemy vehicle, bomb explosion or any other road hazard will result in a lost life. The player can pick up gasoline cans along the way to extend the time limit.

In addition to the main game mode, there's also a practice mode featuring shorter versions of select stages in order to help players familiarize themselves with the controls for each gameplay style. Completing a practice stage will award the player with a power-up that can be used in the main game.

Regional differences
The game was originally released for the Famicom in Japan under the title of Mad City and was retitled The Adventures of Bayou Billy when it was converted to the NES for the international market, undergoing many extensive changes during the localization process. The NES version is harder than the Famicom version; enemies in the beat-'em-up stages are more aggressive and have more health, the player starts the shooting stages with less ammunition, and the driving stages have narrower roads. The driving stages in the Famicom version also give Billy's jeep a health gauge, allowing it to withstand collision from enemy vehicles and road hazards, a benefit not available in the NES version. The Famicom version has four possible endings, whereas the NES version only has one.

The NES version also features many audio and visual changes. Enemy characters and backgrounds are colored differently and the game's heroine, Annabelle, wears more revealing clothing in the NES version (having been changed from a v-neck dress to denim shorts and a midriff-revealing T-shirt). DPCM-coded voice samples were added, such as an announcer declaring the game's title when the player starts the game and Gordon laughing between stages.
In the Japanese version, 4 different endings can be achieved by using certain operations. If played in Easy mode, Billy will save Annabelle but also comments on "something lost", the game then proceeds with a notice of playing the game in a harder mode; beat the game normally results in the usual ending; beat the game but not coming to Annabelle after rescuing her will end up in a "bad ending" in which Annabelle leaves Billy; a fourth ending can be achieved by certain operations and in this ending, Billy and Annabelle will talkin Kansai-ben.

Related media

Comic
Archie Comics published a comic book series based on The Adventures of Bayou Billy written by Rich Margopoulos and illustrated by Amanda Conner, which lasted five bi-monthly issues dated from September 1989 to June 1990. The comic takes liberties with the plot and characterizations of the game and introduces an additional cast of supporting characters. Bayou Billy (whose full name is William Jackson West in the comic) is a bounty hunter assisted by his former military companions of Broadside, Sureshot and Tracker, as they protect the innocent from a local mob led by Giles Gordon and his two sons Rocky and Rocco (who were originally Gordon's bodyguards in the game). Annabelle Lane (who is renamed Annabel Lee) also appears in the comic as an assistant district attorney who becomes romantically involved with Billy after being rescued from Gordon's lackeys. The fourth issue reveals that Billy is a widower whose first wife was killed in an ordered hit by Gordon meant for him.

Television
Bayou Billy also received some amount of exposure on the Nintendo-themed animated TV series Captain N: The Game Master, where Bayou Billy appears in an episode titled "How's Bayou", voiced by Garry Chalk. Playing on the difficulty of its real world counterpart, Bayou Billy was said to be the one game even Captain N was unable to conquer yet. Mother Brain had Dr. Wily build a robot cat to have Duke lead Captain N to Bayou Billy's world. Captain N ended up meeting Bayou Billy where he learned some tricks from him.

See also
 New Orleans in fiction
 Crocodile Dundee

References

External links

1988 video games
1989 comics debuts
Cajuns in video games
Konami beat 'em ups
Konami games
Light gun games
Nintendo Entertainment System games
Nintendo Entertainment System-only games
Racing video games set in the United States
Rail shooters
Side-scrolling beat 'em ups
Side-scrolling video games
Single-player video games
Video games adapted into comics
Video games scored by Kiyohiro Sada
Video games set in Louisiana
Video games set in New Orleans
Video games with oblique graphics
Virtual Console games
Virtual Console games for Wii U
Video games developed in Japan